The yellowfin grouper (Mycteroperca venenosa) is a species of marine ray-finned fish, a grouper from the subfamily Epinephelinae which is part of the family Serranidae, which also includes the anthias and sea basses. It is found in the warmer waters of the western Atlantic Ocean.

Description
The yellowfin grouper has a body which is elongate, robust and compressed, its depth being the no greater at the origin of the dorsal fin as it is at the origin of the anal fin, The standard length is 2.6 to 2.9 times the depth of the body. The preopercle is neatly rounded. sometimes having a small incision, and does not have a lobe at its angle. The dorsal fin contains 11 spines and 15-16 soft rays while the anal fin contains 3 spines and 10-12 soft rays. The membranes between the dorsal fin spines are obviously notched. The caudal fin is a straight in juveniles and a little concave in adults. The head and body are marked with oval groups of dark spots and the outer third of pectoral fin is bright yellow. There are two colour morphs: a deep-water reddish morph and shallow-water greenish morph.

Distribution 
The yellowfin grouper is found in the western Atlantic Ocean. Its range extends along the Atlantic coasts of the United States from North Carolina south to Florida and into the Gulf of Mexico where it occurs in the Florida Keys and the Flower Garden Banks National Marine Sanctuary in Texas south through the Bahamas into the West Indies and the Yucatan Peninsula in Mexico. It is also found around Bermuda. Along the Caribbean coast of South America it occurs as far east as French Guiana. It the occurs along the Brazilian coast from Maranhao to Sao Paulo, including the islands of Trinidade and the Fernando de Noronha.

Habitat and biology
The yellowfin grouper is found over rocky or coral reefs as adults, juveniles are found in beds of turtle grass. This species has also been caught by trawlers over muddy bottoms in the Gulf of Mexico. It forms spawning aggregations and these occur at different times of the year in different parts of its range. This species is mainly piscivorous with over 90% of stomach contents sampled consisting of reef fishes with some squid.

Taxonomy
The yellowfin grouper was first formally described by Carolus Linnaeus in the 10th edition of the Systema Naturae as Perca venenosa in 1758, the type locality was given as "America" but is thought to be the Bahamas.

Utilisation
The yellowfin grouper is caught by recreational and commercial fisheries, however, in some areas, this species is known to carry ciguatoxin and is not much caught for food.

References

yellowfin grouper
Fish of the Western Atlantic
yellowfin grouper
yellowfin grouper